Vivian Guy Valentine (3 December 1887 – 7 August 1967) was an Australian rules footballer and coach in the Victorian Football League.

Valentine made his debut for the Carlton Football Club in Round 2 of the 1911 season.

He retired from playing the game in 1918 and coached the Blues in the 1919 season.

Death
He died in Cheltenham, Victoria on 7 August 1967.

See also
 1908 Melbourne Carnival

References

External links 
 Viv Valentine at Blueseum
 
 

1887 births
1967 deaths
Australian rules footballers from Launceston, Tasmania
Australian Rules footballers: place kick exponents
Carlton Football Club coaches
Carlton Football Club players
Carlton Football Club Premiership players
Launceston Football Club players
Latrobe Football Club players
Tasmanian Football Hall of Fame inductees
One-time VFL/AFL Premiership players